Goch is a railway station in the town of Goch, North Rhine Westphalia, Germany. The station opened on 5 March 1863 on the Lower Left Rhine Railway. The train services are operated by NordWestBahn.

Train services
The station is served by the following services:

Regional service  Kleve - Kevelaer - Krefeld - Düsseldorf

Bus services

An hourly taxi-bus service operates between the station and Weeze Airport.

References

Railway stations in North Rhine-Westphalia
Railway stations in Germany opened in 1863